Casuals United was a far-right British protest group. The group was closely affiliated with the English Defence League. The group described itself as "Uniting the UK's Football Tribes against the Jihadists", and as "an alliance of British Football Casuals of various colours/races who have come together in order to create a massive, but peaceful protest group to force our Government to get their act in gear."

Casuals United was organised around several British football teams' supporters. A leading organiser of Casuals United was Joe Marsh of Barry, South Wales, a former member of the Soul Crew football hooligan firm. He has said: "Hooligans from rival clubs are uniting on this and it is like a ready-made army ... We are protesting against the preachers of hate who are actively encouraging young Muslims in this country to take part in a jihad against Britain."

History
Casuals United were formed in reaction to protests by some Muslims in Luton, reportedly organised by the Islamist group Al-Muhajiroun, against a parade of members of the 2nd Battalion Royal Anglian Regiment returning from fighting in the war in Afghanistan in March 2009. Social networking sites such as Facebook have been used to coordinate protests in London, Luton and Birmingham. In July 2009 the group picketed an Islamic roadshow in London. Casuals United were one of four groups which were prevented from taking part in unofficial marches after Luton Borough Council applied for a banning order under the Public Order Act. In August 2009 the group staged a protest in Birmingham. More protests along with the English Defence League took place in Manchester, Leeds, Stoke, Bolton and Dudley.

Leader of Casuals United Joe Marsh was jailed in August 2015 by Southwark Magistrates for a violent assault on a woman on an anti-cuts demonstration. The woman with a history of violence and drug abuse went to attack Joe Marsh and in defending himself, she fell down some steps. 

Casuals United was disbanded in 2014, and some members went on to form the Pie and Mash Squad, using the phrase "pie and mash" as cockney rhyming slang for "fash", short for fascist. A contributor to Vice News in an article opines these groups were part of an English far-right "war" on anti-fascist football ultras whom they state form most of the fans of Clapton F.C. from 2014 to 2016 and "wave those flags" which there are FA rules prohibiting if political — they add "before the Ultras started going to games the club had an average attendance of around 25. Recent home games have seen hundreds turn up to the club's ground". The article continued that the Pie and Mash facebook page uses the taunt of "silly antifa twats" and was "coordinating protests against various left-wing non-footballing events in the coming months, so maybe the football pitch is just one battle-ground in a wider war".

References

Further reading
Smith, Michael, Who are Casuals United?

External links

Football hooliganism in the United Kingdom
Anti-Islam sentiment in the United Kingdom
English Defence League
Far-right politics in the United Kingdom
2009 establishments in England
2014 disestablishments in England